Robertstown is a Gaelic Athletic Association (GAA) club in Robertstown,  County Kildare, Ireland, affiliated to Kildare GAA.

Gaelic football
Tom Donoghue, a boat-man from Robertstown, played for Kildare in the 1926 All Ireland final. Frank "Sambo" Dowling played for Kildare in the 1935 All Ireland final against Cavan. John Dalton played with Kildare in the 1960s.

Honours
 Kildare Junior Football Championship: (2) 1989, 2011
 Kildare Junior B Football Championship (2) 1980, 1983

Bibliography
 Kildare GAA: A Centenary History, by Eoghan Corry, CLG Chill Dara, 1984,  hb  pb
 Kildare GAA yearbook, 1972, 1974, 1978, 1979, 1980 and 2000- in sequence especially the Millennium yearbook of 2000
 Soaring Sliothars: Centenary of Kildare Camogie 1904-2004 by Joan O'Flynn Kildare County Camogie Board.

External links
Official site
Kildare GAA site
Kildare GAA club sites
Kildare on Hoganstand.com

Gaelic games clubs in County Kildare
Gaelic football clubs in County Kildare